Richard Brydges (1500–1558) was an English politician.

Sir Richard Brydges was the Member of Parliament for Berkshire from 1539 to 1540 and, at other times, for Ludgershall. The Brydges family leased and then owned the manor of Ludgershall in Wiltshire for much of the sixteenth century.

Richard was the son of Henry Brydges (or Bruges), Esq., of Newbury, Berkshire by his wife, Margery (Hungerford) Bedford, daughter of John Hungerford, Esq.  Richard was also a first cousin to John Brydges, 1st Baron Chandos. He served as the High Sheriff of Berkshire in 1554.

Family
He married twice, firstly to a granddaughter of William Norreys, Esquire of the Body to King Edward IV, and secondly to Lady Jane Spencer, the daughter of Sir William Spencer (1483–1558) of Wormleighton & Althorp in Northamptonshire. Richard died on 1 August 1558, after which Jane later married Sir Simon Harcourt.

Sir Richard Brydges and Lady Jane Spencer were the parents of the following children:
  Jane Brydges, born c. 1542
  Anthony Brydges, born c. 1544, m. Barbara Pexsall, 1562
  Edmund Brydges, born c. 1548, d. after 1594 West Bradley, Somerset, m. Alice, daughter of Richard Goddard and Marie Alleyne.
  Frances Brydges, born c. 1553, who married in 1574, Nicholas Stephens, Esq. of Burderop Park near Chiseldon, Wiltshire (1555 - 1611)

Ludgershall Lodge in Wiltshire and Great Shefford Manor in Berkshire were his chief residences, and he and his second wife Lady Jane Spencer are remembered by a large effigial monument in Ludgershall Church.

References

Sources
Royal Berkshire History: Great Shefford Manor
 (which erroneously describes Richard as Lord Chandos' brother)
Ludgershall Church Monument

Members of the Parliament of England for Berkshire
1500 births
1558 deaths
High Sheriffs of Berkshire
High Sheriffs of Oxfordshire
People from Newbury, Berkshire
People from Wiltshire
People from West Berkshire District
English MPs 1529–1536
English MPs 1539–1540
English MPs 1553 (Mary I)
English MPs 1554
English MPs 1554–1555
English MPs 1558